Smithills School is a mixed secondary school located in Smithills, Bolton, Greater Manchester.

Previously a community school administered by Bolton Metropolitan Borough Council, Smithills School converted to academy status on 1 January 2014. However the school continues to coordinate with Bolton Metropolitan Borough Council for admissions.

Smithills School offers GCSEs and BTECs as programmes of study for pupils.

This school was used in the filming of the first series of 4 o'clock club, and was known as Elmsbury High in the TV show

Notable former pupils
Sara Cox, broadcaster
Stu Francis, comedian
Paul Fletcher, footballer
Amir Khan, boxer
Dave Spikey, comedian 
John Longworth, MEP
Paul Nicholls, actor

References

External links
Smithills School official website

Secondary schools in the Metropolitan Borough of Bolton
Academies in the Metropolitan Borough of Bolton